The Beach Boys: Nashville Sounds is documentary film that features studio footage of the making of American rock band the Beach Boys' twenty-eighth studio album Stars and Stripes Vol. 1. The film features interviews with participants of the project.

External links
 

1996 films
Nashville Sounds
Films directed by Alan Boyd
Documentary films about musical groups
1990s English-language films
1990s American films